In mathematics, the Dedekind eta function, named after Richard Dedekind, is a modular form of weight 1/2 and is a function defined on the upper half-plane of complex numbers, where the imaginary part is positive. It also occurs in bosonic string theory.

Definition

Raising the eta equation to the 24th power and multiplying by  gives

where  is the modular discriminant.  The presence of 24 can be understood by connection with other occurrences, such as in the 24-dimensional Leech lattice.

The eta function is holomorphic on the upper half-plane but cannot be continued analytically beyond it.

The eta function satisfies the functional equations

In the second equation the branch of the square root is chosen such that  when .

is a transformation belonging to the modular group. Then

where

Here  is the Dedekind sum

Because of these functional equations the eta function is a modular form of weight  and level 1 for a certain character of order 24 of the metaplectic double cover of the modular group, and can be used to define other modular forms. In particular the modular discriminant of Weierstrass can be defined as

and is a modular form of weight 12.

The Jacobi triple product implies that the eta is (up to a factor) a Jacobi theta function for special values of the arguments:

Explicitly,

The Euler function

has a power series by the Euler identity:

Because the eta function is easy to compute numerically from either power series, it is often helpful in computation to express other functions in terms of it when possible, and products and quotients of eta functions, called eta quotients, can be used to express a great variety of modular forms.

Combinatorial identities 
The theory of the algebraic characters of the affine Lie algebras gives rise to a large class of previously unknown identities for the eta function. These identities follow from the Weyl–Kac character formula, and more specifically from the so-called "denominator identities". The characters themselves allow the construction of generalizations of the Jacobi theta function which transform under the modular group; this is what leads to the identities. An example of one such new identity is

where  is the -analog or "deformation" of the highest weight of a module.

Special values
From the above connection with the Euler function together with the special values of the latter, it can be easily deduced that

Eta quotients
Eta quotients are defined by quotients of the form

Linear combinations of eta quotients at imaginary quadratic arguments may be algebraic, while combinations of eta quotients may even be integral. For example, define,

with the 24th power of the Weber modular function . Then,

and so on, values which appear in Ramanujan–Sato series.

Eta quotients may also be a useful tool for describing bases of modular forms, which are notoriously difficult to compute and express directly. In 1993 Basil Gordon and Kim Hughes proved that if an eta quotient  of the form given above, namely  satisfies

then  is a weight  modular form for the congruence subgroup  (up to holomorphicity) where 

This result was extended in 2019 such that the converse holds for cases when  is coprime to 6, and it remains open that the original theorem is sharp for all integers .  This also extends to state that any modular eta quotient for any  level  congruence subgroup must also be a modular form for the group . While these theorems characterize modular eta quotients, the condition of  holomorphicity must be checked separately using a theorem that emerged from the work of Gérard Ligozat and Yves Martin:

These theorems provide an effective means of creating holomorphic modular eta quotients, however this may not be sufficient to construct a basis for a vector space of modular forms and cusp forms. A useful theorem for limiting the number of modular eta quotients to consider states that a holomorphic weight  modular eta quotient on  must satisfy

where  denotes the largest integer  such that  divides .
These results lead to several characterizations of spaces of modular forms that can be spanned by modular eta quotients. Using the graded ring structure on the ring of modular forms, we can compute bases of vector spaces of modular forms composed of -linear combinations of eta-quotients.

A collection of over 6300 product identities for the Dedekind Eta Function in a canonical, standardized form is available at the Wayback machine of Michael Somos' website.

See also

 Chowla–Selberg formula
 Ramanujan–Sato series
 q-series
 Weierstrass's elliptic functions
 Partition function
 Kronecker limit formula
 Affine Lie algebra

References

Further reading
 
 

Fractals
Modular forms
Elliptic functions